Aethes vachelliana is a species of moth of the family Tortricidae. It is found in the United States, where it has been recorded from California.

The inner two-thirds of the forewings are greyish-black and the outer third is cream. The hindwings are grey.

References

vachelliana
Moths described in 1907
Moths of North America